Former pupils of Bolton School are known as Old Boltonians.

The Old Girls' Association and Old Boltonians' Associations are active with over 9,000 members and nationwide reunions throughout the year. Notable alumni include:

A
 Mark Addis (born 1969), professor of philosophy
 Monica Ali (born 1967), author
 Bryan Appleyard (born 1951), journalist and author

B
 Jack Bond (1932–2019), cricketer
 James Booth (1914–2000), judge, Liberal Party politician

C
 Andrew "Chubby" Chandler (born 1953), sports manager 
 Donald Geoffrey Charlton (1925–1995), Professor of French at the University of Warwick
 Jennifer Clack (née Agnew, 1947–2020), academic; professor and curator of Vertebrate Paleontology at the University of Cambridge
 Gordon Clough (1934–1996), broadcaster
 Sir Philip Craven MBE (born 1950), President of the International Paralympic Committee
 Clive Crook (born 1955), journalist for the Financial Times

D
 Julian Darby (born 1967), former Premier League footballer
 Alex Davidson (born 1992), Salford City Reds rugby league player
 Roger Draper, chief executive of the Lawn Tennis Association and formerly chief executive of Sport England
 Jill Duff (born 1972), Anglican priest and Bishop of Lancaster

E
 Chris Eatough (born 1974), world champion mountain biker
 Sir William Edge, 1st Baronet (1880–1948), politician

G
 Max George (born 1988), singer in the boy band The Wanted
 Chris Goudge (1935–2010), Olympic hurdler

H
 Leslie Halliwell (1929–1989), film writer and historian
 Haseeb Hameed (born 1997), Lancashire, Nottinghamshire and England cricketer
 John Hanscomb CBE (1924–2019), Conservative politician, former Mayor of Bolton
 Robert Haslam, Baron Haslam (1923–2002), former Chair of British Steel and the Coal Board
 Oliver Heywood (1630–1702), nonconformist minister
 John Hick (1815–1894), Conservative Party MP
 Jonathan L. Howard, author

J
 Sir Geoffrey Jackson (1915–1987), British Ambassador to Uruguay

K
 Carol Klein (born 1945), gardening expert, TV presenter and newspaper columnist
 Sir Harry Kroto (1939–2016), 1996 Nobel Prize in Chemistry

L
 Ralf Little (born 1980), actor
 Kate Long (born 1964), author

M
 Sir Ian McKellen (born 1939), actor
 Sarah Mercer (born 1969), linguist
 Patricia Morris, Baroness Morris of Bolton (born 1954), Conservative politician and first Chancellor of the University of Bolton

P
 Callum Parkinson  (born 1996), Leicestershire cricketer
 Matt Parkinson (born 1996), Lancashire and England cricketer
 Andy Paterson, film producer and former second unit director
 Norah Lillian Penston (1903–1974), Principal of Bedford College, University of London
 Nathaniel Phillips (born 1997), Liverpool FC footballer

R
 Mark Radcliffe (born 1958), radio broadcaster
 John Ratledge (born 1974), first-class cricketer
 John Roberts (born ), founder of AO World
 Barbara Ronson (1942–2018), Liberal Democrat politician
 Sir Arthur Rostron (1869–1940), Captain of the RMS Carpathia
 David Ruffley (born 1962), Conservative politician
 Sir Ernest Ryder (born 1957), Lord Justice of Appeal (Court of Appeal) and Senior President of Tribunals; former Chancellor at the University of Bolton (2014–2016)

S
 David Sandiford (born 1970), cricketer and barrister
 Nigel Short (born 1965), chess player
 Becky Smethurst, astrophysicist
 Barry Smith (born 1952), ontologist
 Gerard Corley Smith (1909–1997), diplomat, environmentalist 
 Dame Janet Smith (born 1940), judge
 Peter Smith, Baron Smith of Leigh (born 1945), Labour politician and Life Peer
 Malcolm Stevens FRS (born 1938), chemist
 Edmund Clifton Stoner (1899–1968), theoretical physicist

T
 Ann Taylor, Baroness Taylor of Bolton (born 1947), Labour politician
 Davinia Taylor (née Murphy, born 1977), actress and socialite
 Archis Tiku (born 1977), bassist with the band Maxïmo Park
 Joyce Tyldesley (born 1960), Egyptologist

W
 Mark Williams (born 1978), Informator Choristarum of Magdalen College, Oxford, formerly Director of Music at Jesus College, Cambridge and Assistant Organist of St Paul's Cathedral

See also

References

External links
 Distinguished Old Boys
 Distinguished Old Girls
 Alumni website

Bolton School
 
Bolton School